Since 1908 Australia and Wales have competed against each other in rugby union in 45 matches, Australia having won 31, Wales 13, with 1 draw. Since 2007 the teams have competed for the James Bevan Trophy, which was created to celebrate 100 years of rugby between the two nations.

Summary

Overview

Records
Note: Date shown in brackets indicates when the record was or last set.

History
In the first 70 years, Wales won six of the eight matches. Over the next 10 years it was fairly even, but since the first World Cup in 1987, Australia has dominated by 24 wins to 5. The 2006 match ended in the second highest-scoring draw of all time, 29–29.

Australia snatched victory in the inaugural James Bevan Trophy test match 29–23 with a last minute try at the Telstra Stadium in Sydney on 26 May 2007. They followed this up with a 31–0 victory at Suncorp Stadium in Brisbane.

Wales captured the trophy the following year with a 21–18 victory in Cardiff, but since then it remained in Australian hands with 13 consecutive wins. Three victories in Cardiff in 2009–11 were followed up by a 3–0 series win in Australia in 2012, all by narrow margins. In the return match at Cardiff, Australia once again won with a last minute try.

The 2011 Rugby World Cup brought Australia and Wales together again for another third-place play-off, and once again it was a close finish, with Australia claiming third place in a reversal of the first World Cup in 1987, when Wales won the play-off 22–21.

Wales ended a run of 13 consecutive defeats against Australia on 10 November 2018, winning 9–6. They have since defeated Australia 29–25 in the 2019 Rugby World Cup, and 29–28 in Cardiff on 20 November 2021.

Results

List of series

References

External links
 Results archive from WRU

 
Australia national rugby union team matches
Wales national rugby union team matches
Rugby union rivalries in Australia
Rugby union rivalries in Wales